The Koch Family Children's Museum of Evansville is an interactive children's museum in Evansville, Indiana. The museum educates and inspires children about the world. Exhibits include deconstructing objects, a water exhibit that spans multiple floors, experiences about the human body and its senses, and a gallery for freedom of expression.

Built inside the historic old Central Library, the museum opened in September 2006. The Art Deco building is listed on the National Register of Historic Places and now offers visitors three floors of interactive exhibits and galleries. The museum was designed by Roto Studio, a museum design and engineering firm specializing in creating interactive educational environments and experiences for children as well as adults.

Permanent galleries
 Live Well: The Live Well Gallery exhibit provides children with hands on experiences about the human body, sun protection, healthy eating, and the importance of exercise in order to encourage healthy lifestyle choices.  Activities in the exhibit include opportunities to explore being a doctor, test reaction time, memory, a hands-on play kitchen, bistro, and farmers market.
 Speak Loud: The Speak Loud exhibit encourages children to dramatize a familiar story, play instruments from around the world, create an artistic masterpiece and express their feelings through music, drama and the visual arts.
 Quack Factory- Upper Deck: Every visitor has a role to play in feeding the Great Duck Machine.  Visitors are "workers" and each have a task as balls and ducks are hoisted, dropped, launched, and pushed.
 Quack Factory- Wet Deck: Water flows through the exhibit in amazing ways.  Send a duck around the basin or see if it can survive the nearby lock system.  Create a spouting masterpiece out of pipes and see if it springs a leak. 
 Work Smart: is a place things can be built and taken part. Exhibit activities includes digging for dinosaur bones in the Dino Dig, estimating weight, and deconstructing tools and objects.
Aluminate: a new play tower inspired by aluminum and renewable energy. Come play and slide down the two-story indoor slide!

References

External links
 Children's Museum of Evansville website

Libraries on the National Register of Historic Places in Indiana
Library buildings completed in 1931
Museums established in 2006
National Register of Historic Places in Evansville, Indiana
Children's museums in Indiana
Museums in Evansville, Indiana
Former library buildings in the United States